Mu is a mythical lost continent introduced by Augustus Le Plongeon (1825–1908), who identified the "Land of Mu" with Atlantis. The name was subsequently identified with the hypothetical land of Lemuria by James Churchward (1851–1936), who asserted that it was located in the Pacific Ocean before its destruction. The place of Mu in both pseudoscience and fantasy fiction is discussed in detail in Lost Continents (1954, 1970) by L. Sprague de Camp.

Geologists dismiss the existence of Mu and the lost continent of Atlantis as physically impossible, as a continent can neither sink nor be destroyed in the short period of time asserted in legends and folklore and literature about these places. Mu's existence is considered to have no factual basis.

History of the concept

Augustus Le Plongeon
The mythical idea of the "Land of Mu" first appeared in the works of the British-American antiquarian Augustus Le Plongeon (1825–1908), after his investigations of the Maya ruins in Yucatán. He claimed that he had translated the first copies of the Popol Vuh, the sacred book of the K'iche' from the ancient Mayan using Spanish. He claimed the civilization of Yucatán was older than those of Greece and Egypt, and told the story of an even older continent.

Le Plongeon got the name "Mu" from Charles Étienne Brasseur de Bourbourg, who, in 1864, mistranslated what was then called the Troano Codex (now called "Madrid Codex") using the de Landa alphabet. Brasseur believed that a word which he read as Mu referred to a land that had been submerged by a catastrophe. Le Plongeon identified this lost land with Atlantis and, following Ignatius Donnelly in Atlantis: The Antediluvian World (1882), identified it as a continent that had once existed in the Atlantic Ocean:

Le Plongeon claimed that the civilization of ancient Egypt was founded by Queen Moo, a refugee from the land's demise. Other refugees supposedly fled to Central America and became the Maya.

James Churchward

Mu, as an alternative name for a lost Pacific Ocean continent previously identified as the hypothetical Lemuria (the supposed place of origin for lemurs), was later popularised by James Churchward (1851–1936) in a series of books, beginning with Lost Continent of Mu, the Motherland of Man (1926), re-edited later as The Lost Continent Mu (1931). Other popular books in the series are The Children of Mu (1931) and The Sacred Symbols of Mu (1933).

Churchward claimed that "more than fifty years ago", while he was a soldier in India, he befriended a high-ranking temple priest who showed him a set of ancient "sunburnt" clay tablets, supposedly in a long-lost "Naga-Maya language" which only two other people in India could read. Churchward convinced the priest to teach him the dead language and decipher the tablets by promising to restore and store the tablets, for Churchward was an expert in preserving ancient artifacts. The tablets were written in either Burma or in the lost continent of Mu itself, according to the high priest.  Having mastered the language himself, Churchward found out that they originated from "the place where [man] first appeared—Mu". The 1931 edition states that "all matter of science in this work are based on translations of two sets of ancient tablets": the clay tablets he read in India, and a collection of 2,500 stone tablets that had been uncovered by William Niven in Mexico.

The tablets begin with the creation of Earth, Mu, and the superior human civilization Naacal by the seven commands of the seven superlative intellects of the seven-headed serpent Narayana. This creation story dismisses the theory of evolution. Churchward gave a vivid description of Mu as the home of an advanced civilization, the Naacal, which flourished between 50,000 and 12,000 years ago, was dominated by a “white race", and was "superior in many respects to our own". At the time of its demise, about 12,000 years ago, Mu had 64 million inhabitants and seven major cities, and colonies on the other continents. The 64 million inhabitants were separated as ten tribes that followed one government and one religion.

Churchward claimed that the landmass of Mu was located in the Pacific Ocean, and stretched east–west from the Marianas to Easter Island, and north–south from Hawaii to Mangaia. According to Churchward the continent was supposedly 5,000 miles from east to west and over 3,000 miles from north to south, which is larger than South America. The continent was believed to be flat with massive plains, vast rivers, rolling hills, large bays, and estuaries. He claimed that according to the creation myth he read in the Indian tablets, Mu had been lifted above sea level by the expansion of underground volcanic gases. Eventually Mu "was completely obliterated in almost a single night": after a series of earthquakes and volcanic eruptions, "the broken land fell into that great abyss of fire" and was covered by "fifty millions of square miles of water." Churchward claimed the reasoning for the continent's destruction in one night was because the main mineral on the island was granite and was honeycombed to create huge shallow chambers and cavities filled with highly explosive gases. Once the chambers were empty after the explosion, they collapsed on themselves, causing the island to crumble and sink.

Churchward claimed that Mu was the common origin of the great civilizations of Egypt, Greece, Central America, India, Burma and others, including Easter Island, and was in particular the source of ancient megalithic architecture. As evidence for his claims, he pointed to symbols from throughout the world, in which he saw common themes of birds, the relation of the Earth and the sky, and especially the Sun. Churchward claimed that the king of Mu was named Ra and he related this to the Egyptian god of the sun, Ra, and the Rapa Nui word for Sun, ra’a. He claimed to have found symbols of the Sun in "Egypt, Babylonia, Peru and all ancient lands and countries – it was a universal symbol."

As additional evidence for his claims, Churchward looked to the Holy Bible and found through his own translations that Moses was trained by the Naacal brotherhood in Egypt. Assyria mistranslated when writing and misplaced the Garden of Eden, which according to Churchward would have been located in the Pacific Ocean.
 
Churchward makes references to the Ramayana epic, a religious text of Hindu attributed to sage and historian Valmiki. Valmiki mentions the Naacals as “coming to Burma from the land of their birth in the East,” that is, in the direction of the Pacific Ocean.

Churchward attributed all megalithic art in Polynesia to the people of Mu. He claimed that symbols of the sun are found "depicted on stones of Polynesian ruins", such as the stone hats (pukao) on top of the giant moai statues of Easter Island. Citing W. J. Johnson, Churchward describes the cylindrical hats as "spheres" that "seem to show red in the distance", and asserts that they “represent the Sun as Ra.” He also incorrectly claimed that some of them are made of "red sandstone", which does not exist on the island. The platforms on which the statues rest (ahu) are described by Churchward as being "platform-like accumulations of cut and dressed stone", which were supposedly left in their current positions "awaiting shipment to some other part of the continent for the building of temples and palaces". He also cites the pillars "erected by the Māori of New Zealand" as an example of this lost civilization's handiwork. In Churchward's view, the present-day Polynesians are not descendants of the dominant members of the lost civilization of Mu, responsible for these great works, but are instead descendants of survivors of the cataclysm that adopted "the first cannibalism and savagery" in the world.

John Newbrough
In the 1882 book Oahspe: A New Bible, John Newbrough included a map of the Earth in antediluvian times (i.e. prior to the great flood of biblical record) where an unknown continent is located in the Northern Pacific. Newbrough called this continent Pan.  People often link both Pan and Mu as the same mythological continent since both are claimed to be located in the Pacific. Newbrough continues to claim that the unknown continent disappeared 24,000 years ago, but will soon rise from the Pacific and will be inhabited by the Kosmon race.

Max Heindel
Max Heindel, a Danish-American occultist, wrote about Mu in The Rosicrucian Cosmo-Conception (1909), which offers a different image and chronology. According to Heindel, Mu existed when the Earth's crust was still hardening, in a period of high heat and dense atmosphere. Heindel claims humans existed at this time, but that they had the power to shape-shift. He says they had no eyes but rather two sensitive spots that were affected by the light of the Sun. In the dense atmosphere, humans were guided more by internal perception than by external vision. The language of these humans consisted of the sounds of nature.

Louis Jacolliot
Louis Jacolliot was a French attorney, judge, and occultist who specialized in the translation of Sanskrit. He wrote about the land of the Rutas, a lost land that ancient sources claimed was in the Indian Ocean but which he placed in the Pacific Ocean and associated with Atlantis stories in Histoire des Vierges. Les Peuples et les continents disparus (1874). He amplified upon this in Occult Science in India (1875, English translation 1884). He has been identified as a contributor to Rosicrucianism.

Modern claims
James Bramwell and William Scott-Elliot claimed that the cataclysmic events on Mu began 800,000 years ago and went on until the last catastrophe, which occurred in precisely 9564 BC.

In the 1930s, Atatürk, founder of the Turkish Republic, was interested in Churchward's work and considered Mu as a possible location of the original homeland of the Turks.

Masaaki Kimura has suggested that certain underwater features located off the coast of Yonaguni Island, Japan (popularly known as the  Yonaguni Monument), are ruins of Mu.

Criticisms

Geological arguments
Modern geological knowledge rules out "lost continents" of any significant size.  According to the theory of plate tectonics, which has been extensively confirmed since the 1970s, the Earth's crust consists of lighter "sial" rocks (continental crust rich in aluminium silicates) that float on heavier "sima" rocks (oceanic crust richer in magnesium silicates). The sial is generally absent in the ocean floor where the crust is a few kilometers thick, while the continents are huge solid blocks tens of kilometers thick.  Since continents float on the sima much like icebergs float on water, a continent cannot simply "sink" under the ocean.

It is true that continental drift and seafloor spreading can change the shape and position of continents and occasionally break a continent into two or more pieces (as happened to Pangaea). However, these are very slow processes that occur in geological time scales (hundreds of millions of years). Over the scale of history (tens of thousands of years), the sima under the continental crust can be considered solid, and the continents are basically anchored on it. It is almost certain that the continents and ocean floors have retained their present position and shape for the whole span of human existence.

There is also no conceivable event that could have "destroyed" a continent, since its huge mass of sial rocks would have to end up somewhere—and there is no trace of it at the bottom of the oceans. The Pacific Ocean islands are not part of a submerged landmass but rather the tips of isolated volcanoes.

This is the case, in particular, of Easter Island, which is a recent volcanic peak surrounded by deep ocean (3,000 m deep at 30 km off the island). After visiting the island in the 1930s, Alfred Métraux observed that the moai platforms are concentrated along the current coast of the island, which implies that the island's shape has changed little since they were built. Moreover, the "Triumphal Road" that Pierre Loti had reported ran from the island to the submerged lands below, is actually a natural lava flow. Furthermore, while Churchward was correct in his claim that the island has no sandstone or sedimentary rocks, the point is irrelevant because the pukao are all made of native volcanic scoria.

Archaeological evidence

Easter Island was first settled around AD 300 and the pukao on the moai are regarded as having ceremonial or traditional headdresses.

In popular culture

Film/television
 In the 1935 film The Phantom Empire, the inhabitants of Murania are the lost tribe of Mu.
 In the 1963 film Atragon, Mu is an undersea kingdom protected by their sea dragon god Manda.
 In the 1970 kaiju film Gamera vs. Jiger, Jiger originates from the lost continent of Mu.
 Tezuka’s classic anime film, Undersea Super Train: Marine Express, storytelling revolves around Mu Civilization under Empress Sapphire.
 In the 1982–1983 French-Japanese animated series The Mysterious Cities of Gold, Tao is the last living descendant of the sunken empire of Mu (Hiva in the English dub).
 In the 1983 Doraemon film Doraemon: Nobita and the Castle of the Undersea Devil, Doraemon and friends meet a young boy from Mu who is an undersea person and a soldier of Federal Army of Mu. They set out into the Bermuda Triangle to stop the army inside the lost city of Atlantis.
 In the 1983–1984 anime Super Dimension Century Orguss, the main antagonists are robots that were built by the ancient civilization of the Mu that turned on their creators and tried to annihilate all remaining life on Earth. Throughout the series, the robots are referred to as the Mu. 
 In the 2001–2002 anime RahXephon the inhabitants of Mu, which are referred to as Mulians, serve as the show's primary antagonists.
In the 2003-2005 anime Sonic X, the plot of episodes 47 and 48 unfolds in the search for the legendary continent of Murasia and its advanced civilization.
 "Stones" by Ty Sanga
 In the 2021 Anime TROPICAL-ROUGE! PRECURE The Land of Mu is mentioned in episode 36 by Ichinose Minori (Cure Papaya they are disucssing sea kingdons in Folk and fairy tales.

Literature/print
H. P. Lovecraft (1890–1937) featured the lost continent in his revision of Hazel Heald's short story "Out of the Aeons" (1935). Mu appears in numerous Cthulhu mythos stories, including many written by Lin Carter.
 In Marvel Comics, the continents of Mu and Atlantis were destroyed by the Celestials. Their evacuation was aided by the Eternals.
 In Fredric Brown's short story "Letter to a Phoenix" (1949), the 180,000 year old narrator lists the six human civilizations he saw fall during his lifetime. Mu is the fifth of them (the last one being Atlantis).
 The 1967 Andre Norton novel Operation Time Search features a modern-day protagonist cast back in time, where he participates in a war between Atlantis and Mu.
 The 1970 Mu Revealed is a humorous spoof by Raymond Buckland purporting to describe the long lost civilization of Muror, located on the legendary lost continent of Mu. The book was written  under the pseudonym "Tony Earll", an anagram of "not really". The book claimed to present a translation of a diary compiled by a boy called Kland found and translated by an archaeologist named "Reedson Hurdlop", an anagram of "Rudolph Rednose".
 "The Justified Ancients of Mu Mu", a fictional secret society in Eye in the Pyramid, the first book in the 1975 trilogy The Illuminatus! Trilogy by Robert Anton Wilson and Robert Shea
 Tom Robbins' novel Still Life with Woodpecker (1980) makes extensive reference to Mu.
 Alison Bailey Kennedy, an Editor-in-Chief of the cyberculture magazine Mondo 2000, published under the pseudonym of Queen Mu.
 In the manga version of Shaman King (1998–2004) the final rounds of the Shaman Tournament, as well as the Great Spirit ceremony, are held on the island (which is submerged and hidden by Patch Tribe rituals).
 The continent figures into the 2009 novel Inherent Vice by Thomas Pynchon.
 Mu features prominently in two Corto Maltese adventures - Under the Sign of Capricorn and Mu, The Last Continent
 In the manga Nihonkoku Shouka ("Japan Summons"), the country of Mu was a large continental island that mysteriously transported off Earth over 12,000 years ago into a new world.

Music
 Robert Plant, of Led Zeppelin, used the feather symbol of Mu on the sleeve of Led Zeppelin IV.
 The rock band MU (1971–1974), created by American rock guitar musicians Jeff Cotton and Merrell Wayne Fankhauser, took its name from the book The Lost Continent Mu (1931).
 The Justified Ancients of Mu Mu is an early name of the British pop music group KLF active between 1987 and 1992.
 Mu Empire is the name of the second track on Long Island post-hardcore band Glassjaw's second studio album, Worship and Tribute.
 The band the Grateful Dead named their second album, Anthem of the Sun from the Churchward book. In his book there is an instrument, made from a skull, that was used to perform the "Anthem of the Sun".
 The band Therion released an album called Lemuria back in 2004. In the song Lemuria, lyrics refer to the Lemuria island.

Video games
 The SquareSoft (later Square Enix) video game released in Japanese markets as SaGa 3 (1991) and in the United States as Final Fantasy Legend III (1993) features a town known as Muu and situated on land flooded between the game's Past and (second) Present time phases.
 In Terranigma, the third game in the unofficial Quintet trilogy, alongside Soul Blazer and Illusion of Gaia, both Mu and Polynese are secret continents that may be resurrected towards the end of the first chapter of the game, once the main continents have been resurrected.
 MU Online is a 2003 3D fantasy MMORPG developed in Korea and popular there, "based on the legendary Continent of MU".
 Mega Man Star Force 2 from 2007 features a whole story of Mu, the lost FM technology that past civilizations built was found here. One of the antagonists (and later anti-hero) introduced in this game, Solo, is the last living descendant of the people of Mu.
 In the DS version of the video game SpongeBob's Atlantis SquarePantis, Mu is featured as the second world in-between Bikini Bottom and Atlantis.
 In the 2016 mobile game Honkai Impact 3rd, Mu was a continent that existed 50,000 years ago and was largely destroyed by the Herrscher of Earth. The remaining part of Mu was salvaged by transporting it into the Sea of Quanta, where it continues to exist as a bubble universe and is inhabited by androids known as ELFs. The characters Eden and Elysia are originally from Mu.

See also

Doggerland
Kumari Kandam
Lost city
Lost lands
Mauritia (microcontinent)
Agartha
Zealandia

References

External links

 James Churchward's book, The Lost Continent of Mu, on Bibliotecapleyades

Earth mysteries
Easter Island
Mythological places
Pseudohistory
Theoretical continents
Atlantis